The Brides of Dracula is a 1960 British supernatural horror film produced by Hammer Film Productions. Directed by Terence Fisher, the film stars Peter Cushing, David Peel, Freda Jackson, Yvonne Monlaur, Andrée Melly, and Martita Hunt. The film is a sequel to the 1958 film Dracula (also known as Horror of Dracula), though the character of Count Dracula does not appear in the film, and is instead mentioned only twice. Christopher Lee would reprise his role as Dracula in the next film in the Dracula series, Dracula: Prince of Darkness (1966).

Filming began for The Brides of Dracula on 16 January 1960 at Bray Studios. It was developed under the working titles Dracula 2 and Disciple of Dracula. The finished film premièred at the Odeon Marble Arch on 6 July 1960. It was distributed theatrically in 1960 on a double bill with The Leech Woman.

Plot
Marianne Danielle, a young French schoolteacher en route to taking up a position in Transylvania, is abandoned at a village inn by her coach driver. Ignoring the warnings of the locals, she accepts the offer of Baroness Meinster to spend the night at her castle. The Baroness's handsome son, Baron Meinster, is said to be insane and kept confined. After sneaking into his quarters to meet him, she is shocked to find the Baron chained up to a wall. He says that his mother has usurped his rightful lands and pleads for Marianne's help. She agrees to steal the key to his chain from the Baroness' bedroom and free him.

The Baron later kills his mother and drinks her blood. The Baroness' servant Greta, finds her mistress' corpse. Marianne flees into the night upon seeing this, while Greta blames the dead Baroness for having allowed the baron to be turned into a vampire by Dracula. She also chastises the Baroness for chaining the baron in his room and luring girls to feed him. Despite knowing the evil he intends for the village, Greta remains loyal to the Baron.

Exhausted, Marianne is found by Doctor Van Helsing the following morning and does not remember all that has happened. He escorts her to the school where she is to be employed. When Van Helsing reaches the village inn, he finds there is a funeral in progress. A young girl has been found dead in the woods with wounds upon her throat. Father Stepnik, who had requested Van Helsing's presence, joins the doctor in his investigation, and the two try to dissuade the girl's father from burying her. Unfortunately, he does not listen, and she becomes a vampire. Stepnik and Van Helsing go to the cemetery that night, only to find Greta aiding the newly vampirised girl to rise from her grave. The men try to stop them, but Greta holds them off and allows the girl to flee.

Van Helsing goes to the castle and discovers the Baroness, now risen as a vampire herself, and the Baron. After a brief scuffle, the Baron flees on a coach driven, abandoning his mother. Knowing that the transformation was the Baron's revenge on his mother for locking him up, Van Helsing takes pity on her and, after sunrise the next morning, kills her with a wooden stake. The Baron, meanwhile, visits Marianne and asks her to marry him. She accepts, much to the good-natured envy of her roommate Gina. Once Gina is alone, the Baron appears in her room and drains her of her blood.

The next day, Van Helsing inspects Gina's body and orders that it be placed in a horse stable under constant vigilance. That night, Marianne assumes the role of guarding the corpse. She is with the stable keeper, Severin, who goes outside for a moment and is killed by a vampire bat. Inside, the lid of the coffin is pushed open, and Gina rises, now a vampire. As she approaches Marianne, Gina reveals the whereabouts of the Baron, who is hiding at the old mill.

Van Helsing appears and saves Marianne from being bitten by Gina, who flees. Reluctantly, Marianne tells Van Helsing what Gina told her. He goes to the old mill and finds the Baron's coffin. He is soon confronted by both of Meinster's brides and wards them off with his cross. Greta, still human,wrestles it away from him, only to trip and plummet from the rafters, dying in the fall. The Baron then arrives, subdues Van Helsing and bites him, inflicting him with vampirism before leaving. After waking up, Van Helsing heats a metal tool in a brazier, cauterises his wound and pours holy water on it to purify it. The wound disappears.

Baron Meinster, meanwhile, abducts Marianne and brings her to the mill, intending to vampirise her in front of Van Helsing. As the Baron attempts to hypnotise her to make her compliant to his will, Van Helsing throws the holy water into his face, which sears him like acid. The Baron kicks over the brazier of hot coals, starting a fire. He runs outside as the brides make their escape. Van Helsing runs to the huge sails, which he moves to form the shadow of a gigantic cross over Baron Meinster, who is killed by his exposure to the symbol. Van Helsing comforts Marianne as the mill burns.

Cast

 Peter Cushing as Doctor Van Helsing
 Yvonne Monlaur as Marianne
 David Peel as Baron Meinster
 Martita Hunt as Baroness Meinster
 Freda Jackson as Greta
 Miles Malleson as Doctor Tobler
 Henry Oscar as Herr Lang
 Mona Washbourne as Frau Lang
 Andrée Melly as Gina
 Victor Brooks as Hans
 Fred Johnson as the priest
 Michael Ripper as the coachman
 Norman Pierce as the landlord
 Vera Cook as the landlord's wife
 Marie Devereux as the village girl
 Michael Mulcaster (uncredited) as Latour
 Harold Scott (uncredited) as Severin
 George Melly (uncredited) as Narrator

Production notes
After the success of Dracula, Hammer commissioned Jimmy Sangster to write a sequel titled Disciple of Dracula, about an acolyte of the vampire, with Count Dracula himself only making a cameo appearance. Sangster's script was rewritten by Peter Bryan to remove references to Dracula, while adding the character of Van Helsing. The screenplay was then further revised by Edward Percy. Reportedly, Sangster, director Terence Fisher and Cushing also were involved in the rewrites.

Producer Anthony Hinds stated: "My own personal involvement in a film like Brides was always 100 percent, not because I felt it to be my duty but because I felt very strongly that the pictures were mine. No doubt Terry [Fisher] thought they were his and Jimmy Sangster thought they belonged to him. And Peter C.  they were his."

Most of the interior shots were done at Bray Studios. The exterior shooting locations were in nearby Black Park and Oakley Court. The scene in which the locks drop from Gina's coffin was derived from M. R. James's story "Count Magnus".

Release

Box Office
Kine Weekly called it a "money maker" at the British box office in 1960.

Critical Reception
The Monthly Film Bulletin of the UK wrote: "The genuinely eerie atmosphere of traditional Vampire folk-lore continues to elude the cinema. This latest sequel in Hammer's apparently endless series adds little to the Dracula legend other than a youthful, good-looking vampire, and nothing to the familiar Hammer format of inappropriate colour and décor, a vague pretence at period and a serious surface view of the proceedings." Bosley Crowther of The New York Times dismissed the film as "but another repetition of the standard tale of the vampire ... There is nothing new or imaginative about it." Variety called the film "technically well-made" but thought the script "adds little to the Dracula legend and follows formula horror gimmicks," and that "it would have been considerably more scary if it had been filmed in old-fashioned black and white." Harrison's Reports wrote that Martita Hunt and Freda Jackson were "excellent" in the film and the direction and photography were "first class," but that it was "not overly frightening."

The Brides of Dracula holds a score of 78% on Rotten Tomatoes, based on 18 reviews.

Home media
A region 1 DVD edition of the film (in a two double-sided disc box set, along with seven other Hammer classics originally distributed by Universal International) was released on 6 September 2005. This set was re-released on Blu-ray on 13 September 2016.
A region 2 DVD edition of the film was released on 15 October 2007.
A region B Blu-ray/DVD Double Play was released on 26 August 2013. In this release, the original aspect ratio was overcropped from 1.66 to 2.0.

In other media 
The Brides of Dracula was adapted into a 15-page comics story by Steve Moore and John Stokes, which was published in two parts in Halls of Horror issues #27–28, published in 1983 by Quality Communications.

See also
 Vampire films

References

External links

Review of movie at New York Times
Review of film at Cinefantastique

Brides of Dracula Wiki

1960 films
1960 horror films
British sequel films
Hammer Film Productions horror films
Dracula films
Gothic horror films
Films directed by Terence Fisher
Films scored by Malcolm Williamson
Films set in Transylvania
Films shot at Bray Studios
Universal Pictures films
British vampire films
Films with screenplays by Jimmy Sangster
Dracula (Hammer film series)
Films set in castles
1960s English-language films
1960s British films